John O. Miner (June 22, 1910 – April 21, 1999) was a rear admiral in the United States Navy.

Biography
Miner was born John Odgers Miner in Cedar Rapids, Iowa in 1910. He died on April 21, 1999.

Career
Miner graduated from the United States Naval Academy in 1931.

While in command of the Tingey, he was awarded the Silver Star for his service during a period of time that included participating in the Battle of the Philippine Sea and the Battle of Leyte Gulf. He also received a Letter of Commendation during his command.

Other awards he received include: the Legion of Merit, the Navy Commendation Medal, the American Defense Service Medal with award star, the American Campaign Medal, the Asiatic-Pacific Campaign Medal with five engagement stars, the World War II Victory Medal, the China Service Medal, the Navy Occupation Service Medal, the National Defense Service Medal, the United Nations Korea Medal, the Philippine Liberation Medal and the Order of Merit of the Italian Republic.

References

1910 births
1999 deaths
United States Navy admirals
United States Navy personnel of World War II
United States Navy personnel of the Korean War
Recipients of the Silver Star
Recipients of the Legion of Merit
United States Naval Academy alumni
People from Cedar Rapids, Iowa
Military personnel from Iowa